This is a list of serving senior officers of the British Army. It includes currently serving generals, lieutenant generals, major generals, and brigadiers.

Generals

Lieutenant generals

Major generals

Chaplain-Generals

Brigadiers

Acting

Deputy Chaplain-Generals

See also
 List of serving senior officers of the Royal Navy
 List of serving senior officers of the Royal Marines
 List of serving senior officers of the Royal Air Force

References

Officers
Serving
British Army
Army senior officers
British Army